Climate change in the Netherlands is already affecting the country. The average temperature in the Netherlands rose by more than 2 °C from 1901 to 2020. Climate change has resulted in increased frequency of droughts and heatwaves. Because significant portions of the Netherlands have been reclaimed from the sea or otherwise are very near sea level, the Netherlands is very vulnerable to sea level rise.

The Netherlands has the fourth largest CO2 emissions per capita of the European Union.  The Dutch government has set goals to lower emissions in the next few decades. The Dutch response to climate change is driven by a number of unique factors, including larger green recovery plans by the European Union in the face of the COVID-19 and a climate change litigation case, State of the Netherlands v. Urgenda Foundation, which created mandatory climate change mitigation through emissions reductions 25% below 1990 levels. At the end of 2018 CO2 emissions were down 15% compared to 1990 levels. The goal of the Dutch government is to reduce emissions in 2030 by 49%.

Greenhouse gas emissions 
The Netherlands has the fourth largest CO2 per capita emissions of the European Union. The Netherlands is responsible for 0.46% of the worlds CO2 emissions. CO2 emissions went down 15% in 2018 comparing to 1990.

Impacts on the natural environment 

The temperature has risen by an average of 1 degrees Celsius globally in the last 130 years, while in The Netherlands the average temperature has risen by 1.7 degrees Celsius in that time. The sea level has risen 20 centimetres.

Temperature and weather changes 

The top 5 of the highest average temperature in a year were all in the last two decades with 2014 having the highest average temperature of 11.7 degrees Celsius. The last 121 years the Royal Netherlands Meteorological Institute has kept record of the heatwaves in The Netherlands, 29 heatwaves have occurred since then, 14 heatwaves have occurred in the last 21 years. Five heatwaves have occurred during the last 3 years with 2018 and 2019 having two heatwaves a year. In the first heatwave of 2019 there was a record temperature of 40.7 degrees Celsius in Gilze en Rijen. The last few years heatwaves have been stronger than expected. Scientists expected that temperatures would increase 1.5 degrees Celsius during a heatwave but when measured it points out that it is actually 3 degrees Celsius.

In the summer of 2018, there was a big drought. 2018 is one of the top 5 years with the lowest rainfall in The Netherlands, with it having a shortage of 309 millimetres of rain. The drought had the biggest impact inland and less of an impact in the coastal areas. 2019 was also drier than it would be normally.

The annual precipitation has increased by 8% between 1961 and 2020 mostly during the winter and summer precipitation has increased, only during the spring a decrease was found, the increase in precipitation has mostly stopped since 2000. Days that recorded a minimum temperature of below 0ºC has decreased by two weeks annually in the same period, the number of days that recorded a maximum temperature below 0ºC has decreased by 5 days annually.

Sea level rise 

The sea level has risen about 12 to 20 centimeters from 1902 to 2010. The rate at which the sea level is rising has increased. In the last few years, it has risen twice as fast compared to the 20th century, with a rise of 4 to 5 millimeters every year. The rate at which the sea level is rising is still increasing. The KNMI researched that in the worst case scenario sea levels would increase 54-121 cm  in 2100 that would happen if the CO2 emissions would double by 2050 and at the end of the century temperature would have risen to 4.4ºC. In the second best scenario sea levels would rise to 30-81 cm by the end of the century if net zero would be reached after 2050 and a stabilisation of 1.8ºC at the end of the century. sea level rise The Dutch government says that the current protection is adequate until 2050.

Mitigation and adaptation

Adaptation approaches 
Numerous countries have  planned or started adaptation measures. The Netherlands, along with the Philippines and Japan and United Nations Environment, launched the Global Centre of Excellence on Climate Adaptation in 2017.

As part of its commitment to environmental sustainability, the Government of the Netherlands initiated a plan to establish over 200 recharging stations for electric vehicles across the country. The rollout will be undertaken by Switzerland-based power and automation company ABB and Dutch startup Fastned, and will aim to provide at least one station within a 50-kilometre radius (30 miles) from every home in the Netherlands.

The Cultural Heritage Agency of the Netherlands executes a programme on water and heritage to provide information that can be of use in spatial planning by civil services and indicates how archaeological data and historical analysis can be used for current and future water-management problems.

Policies and legislation 
The Dutch government has signed numerous climate agreements, such as:

 United Nations Framework Convention on Climate Change in 1992
Kyoto Protocol was signed in 1997 (the Kyoto protocol was ongoing in 2008–2012, had a target to reduce global emissions 8% from 1990. The Netherlands target for GHG emissions for the period 2008–2012 was −6% changes in emissions from the base year (1990) and the result was −6.3%.)
Paris Agreement was signed in 2015

Paris agreement 

The Paris agreement is a legally binding international agreement. Its main goal is to limit global warming to below 1.5 degrees Celsius, compared to pre-industrial levels. The Nationally Determined Contributions (NDC's) are the plans to fight climate change adapted for each country. Every party in the agreement has different targets based on its own historical climate records and country's circumstances and all the targets for each country are stated in their NDC.

In the long-term low GHG emission development strategies (LT-LEDS) the Netherlands have chosen to focus on one main target, cut its greenhouse gas emissions by 49% by 2030. As an interim target to the climate act the Netherlands must reduce its greenhouse gas emissions by 95% by 2050 compared to 1990.

Society and culture

Public opinion 
The European Commission released a report in 2019 which found that 74% of Dutch people see climate change as a severe problem.

The Social Cultural Planning Bureau (SCP) found that Climate Change was the second biggest concern from the Dutch public.

Ipsos polled Dutch people in late 2020 about climate change, commissioned by the Dutch bank ABN AMRO.  Two in five Dutch people see the COVID-19 pandemic as an wake-up call for the climate. 75% of respondents want that the 'positive changes' from the COVID-19 pandemic like the reduction of CO2 emissions caused by a reduction of traffic and flights should stay. 50% would permanently change their travel habits for that goal. A majority of the respondents wants that COVID-19 financial relief packages should also have the goal to make the Netherlands sustainable in a faster pace.

The European Investment Bank conducted polls across the European Union in 2020–2021. The poll showed that Dutch people find it easiest to give up flying with 40% of respondents giving that answer. After flying there is meat (19%), video streaming (17%), new clothes (12%) and their car (10%). Giving up their car was the most difficult option at 40%. 9% of respondents said that are making radical lifestyle changes to combat climate change which is lower than the EU average which is 19%. 77% of people aged 15–29 years old in the EU believe their behaviors can combat climate change. 22% of respondents said that they will avoid to fly after the pandemic has ended, 30% said that they would go on vacation in the Netherlands or in nearby countries and 36% said that they would continue their previous flying habits, which is higher than the EU average (31%).

Protests 
Numerous protests have been held with the biggest protest drawing 40.000 people in Amsterdam on 10 March 2019.

Extinction Rebellion has also demonstrated in the Netherlands with actions as blocking traffic on one of the busiest road in Amsterdam in front the Rijksmuseum  and blocking traffic in other parts of the country as well as other actions. Extinction rebellion together with Greenpeace organized a demonstration in the airport Schiphol, 26 protesters were arrested.

Youth for climate 
The first big demonstration that was organized by Youth for Climate was on 7 February 2019 in The Hague. Youth for Climate estimated that 15.000 students protested. A second strike took place on 14 March 2019 in Amsterdam. With 5.000 to 6.000 students striking. A third climate strike took place on 24 May 2019 with 1.500 students striking in Utrecht. On 20 September 2019 2.500 students protested in Maastricht. On 27 September 2019 the biggest protest took place with 35.000 people attending in The Hague.

Court cases

State of the Netherlands versus Urgenda Foundation

See also 
Plug-in electric vehicles in the Netherlands

References 

 
Netherlands
Environment of the Netherlands